Cheongoksan is a mountainous in the province of Gangwon-do, South Korea. Its area extends across the counties of  Jeongseon and  Pyeongchang.

See also
List of mountains in Korea

Notes

References
  

Mountains of South Korea
Jeongseon County
Pyeongchang County
Mountains of Gangwon Province, South Korea
One-thousanders of South Korea